Tokelau may refer to:

Places
 British Western Pacific Territories, included Tokelau
 Realm of New Zealand, includes Tokelau
 Tokelau, a New Zealand dependent territory in Polynesia
 Atafu, a group of 52 coral islets within Tokelau 
 2006 Tokelauan self-determination referendum
 Administrator of Tokelau, an official of the New Zealand Government
 Badge of Tokelau, a traditional Tokelauan carved wooden “tackle box”
 Constitutional history of Tokelau
 Council for the Ongoing Government of Tokelau, the executive council of Tokelau
 Fakaofo, an atoll within Tokelau
 General Fono, the parliament of Tokelau
 Health care in Tokelau
 List of birds of Tokelau
 List of mammals of Tokelau
 Music of Tokelau
 Nukunonu, the largest islet within Tokelau
 Outline of Tokelau
 Politics of Tokelau
 Religion in Tokelau
 Tui Tokelau, a god worshipped in Tokelau
 Rugby union in Tokelau
 Tokelau (islet), an islet in Nukunonu, Tokelau
 Tokelauan language, an Austronesian language, spoken in this territory as well as on the Swains Island
 Tokelau national rugby league team
 Tokelauan people
 Treaty of Tokehega, establishing the boundary between Tokelau and the United States of America
 Tokelau, Tuvalu, a village on Nanumaga, Tuvalu

Other uses
 Tinea imbricata, a superficial fungal infection also known as Tokelau